Dan Forestal (March 3, 1983 – July 14, 2021) was a Democratic member of the Indiana House of Representatives, representing the 100th District.

Forestal was born on March 3, 1983, in Indianapolis, Indiana, to Marianne Forestal.  He attended Little Flower Catholic Grade School and Roncalli High School, graduating in 2001.  He joined the Indianapolis Fire Department ("IFD") in 2007 and served at station 25 in the historic Indianapolis neighborhood of Irvington, on the East Side.

Forestal was arrested on August 11, 2019, and charged with operating a vehicle while intoxicated, resisting law enforcement, and impersonating a public servant. Forestal died on July 14, 2021, with police opening an investigation after finding him dead at the Quality Inn Northwest on Wesleyan Road in Indianapolis.  He was 38.

References

External links
State Representative Dan Forestal Official Indiana State Legislature site

Democratic Party members of the Indiana House of Representatives
21st-century American criminals
21st-century American politicians
Politicians from Indianapolis
1983 births
2021 deaths
Indiana University alumni